Goldstone may refer to:

Places
Goldstone, Shropshire, a small village in Shropshire, England
Goldstone, California, a ghost town near the Goldstone Deep Space Communications Complex
Goldstone Lake, a dry lake in the Mojave Desert of San Bernardino County, California
Goldstone Vallis, a valley on Mercury

Objects
 Goldstone (glass), a gemstone simulant
 Goldstone boson, certain bosons in particle and condensed-matter physics
 Goldstone Deep Space Communications Complex, a network of radio antennas in California's Mojave Desert
 Goldstone Solar System Radar
 Goldstone Ground, the former stadium of Brighton & Hove Albion football club
 Goldstone Primary School, a primary school in Hove
 4433 Goldstone, a main-belt asteroid discovered on August 30, 1981, by Ted Bowell

Other uses
 Goldstone (surname)
 Goldstone (film), a 2016 Australian film
 Goldstone (band), a British girl group
 Goldstone Tires, a tire manufacturer based in Tehran, Iran

See also
 Goldstino
 Goldstone's theorem
 Goldstone boson
 Sgoldstino
 United Nations Fact Finding Mission on the Gaza Conflict